The 1912 Tour de France was the 10th edition of Tour de France, one of cycling's Grand Tours. The Tour began in Paris on 30 June and Stage 8 occurred on 14 July with a flat stage to Perpignan. The race finished in Paris on 28 July.

Stage 1
30 June 1912 — Paris to Dunkerque,

Stage 2
2 July 1912 — Dunkerque to Longwy,

Stage 3
4 July 1912 — Longwy to Belfort,

Stage 4
6 July 1912 — Belfort to Chamonix,

Stage 5
8 July 1912 — Chamonix to Grenoble,

Stage 6
10 July 1912 — Grenoble to Nice,

Stage 7
12 July 1912 — Nice to Marseille,

Stage 8
14 July 1912 — Marseille to Perpignan,

References

1912 Tour de France
Tour de France stages